Key Code Qualifier is an error-code returned by a SCSI device.

When a SCSI target device returns a check condition in response to a command, the initiator usually then issues a SCSI Request Sense command.  This process is part of a SCSI protocol called Contingent Allegiance Condition.  The target will respond to the Request Sense command with a set of SCSI sense data which includes three fields giving increasing levels of detail about the error:
K - sense key - 4 bits, (byte 2 of Fixed sense data format)
C - additional sense code (ASC) - 8 bits, (byte 12 of Fixed sense data format)
Q - additional sense code qualifier (ASCQ) - 8 bits, (byte 13 of Fixed sense data format)
The initiator can take action based on just the K field which indicates if the error is minor or major.  However all three fields are usually logically combined into a 20 bit field called Key Code Qualifier or KCQ.  The specification for the target device will define the list of possible KCQ values.  In practice there are many KCQ values which are common between different SCSI device types and different SCSI device vendors.  Common values are listed below, you should consult your hardware specific documentation as well.

List of common SCSI KCQs

References
 T10: SCSI ASC/ASCQ Assignments

SCSI